Akan Williams (born February 16, 1970) is a Nigerian academic, professor of analytical/environmental chemistry, and 6th vice-chancellor of the Covenant University. Prior to succeeding AAA Atayero as Vice-Chancellor, he was the Deputy Vice-Chancellor and Head, Department of Chemistry, Covenant University.

He earned a Bachelor of Science degree in chemistry from the University of Calabar in 1991, an MSc degree in Petroleum Chemistry from the University of Port Harcourt in 2001, and a Ph.D. in Environmental Chemistry from Covenant University.

His research focus on the monitoring of organic pollutants in the environment and a former Chairman of the Chemical Society of Nigeria, Ogun State Chapter. He is also a Pastor with the Living Faith Church and serves as the District Pastor, Winners Satellite Fellowship (WSF), Canaan Land.

Professor Akan Williams is married to Deaconess Lifted Williams, and the union is blessed with two children.

References 

Living people
Vice-Chancellors of Nigerian universities
Academic staff of Covenant University
1970 births
University of Calabar alumni